Riha or Ariha or RIHA may refer to:

Places
 Urfa, a city in southeastern Turkey, known in Kurdish as Riha
 Jericho, a city in the West Bank, known in Arabic as Riha or 
 Ariha, or Riha, a town in Syria
 Riha, Manipur, a village in India

Other uses 
 Riha (garment), an Assamese traditional garment
 Říha, a Czech surname
 International Association of Research Institutes in the History of Art, or RIHA
 Administration system for the state information system RIHA, Estonian catalogue of public sector information systems
 RIHA, a Dutch electronic organ builder, for instance of the Riha Adagio

See also